Heliozela cuprea is a moth of the Heliozelidae family. It was described by Walsingham in 1897. It is found in the West Indies.

References

Moths described in 1897
Heliozelidae